In Mahayana Buddhism the icchantika is a deluded being who can never attain enlightenment (Buddhahood).

Description
According to some Mahayana Buddhist scriptures, the icchantika is the most base and spiritually deluded of all types of being. The term implies being given over to total hedonism and greed.

In the Tathagatagarbha sutras, some of which pay particular attention to the icchantikas, the term is frequently used of those persons who do not believe in the Buddha, his eternal Selfhood and his Dharma (Truth) or in karma; who seriously transgress against the Buddhist moral codes and vinaya; and who speak disparagingly and dismissively of the reality of the immortal Buddha-nature (Buddha-dhatu) or Tathagatagarbha present within all beings.

The two shortest versions of the Mahayana Mahaparinirvana Sutra - one translated by Fa-xian, and the other a middle-length Tibetan version of the sutra - indicate that the icchantika has so totally severed all his/her roots of goodness that he/she can never attain liberation and nirvana or enlightenment (Buddhahood). The full-length Dharmakshema version of the Mahayana Mahaparinirvana Sutra, in contrast, insists that even the icchantika can eventually find release into nirvana, since no phenomenon is fixed (including this type of allegedly deluded person) and that change for the better and best is always a possibility.

Other scriptures (such as the Lankavatara Sutra) indicate that the icchantikas will be saved through the liberational power of the Buddha -  who, it is claimed, will never abandon any being.

Buswell notes: "With the prominent exception of the Faxian-School [...], East Asian Buddhists rejected the icchantica-doctrine in favor of the notion that all beings, even the denizens of hell, retained the capacity to attain enlightenment."

See also 
Tao Sheng
Abomination (Bible)
Hylics

Notes

References

Further reading 
 Karashima, Seishi (2007). Who were the Icchantikas?, Annual Report of The International Research Institute for Advanced Buddhology at Soka University 10, 61-80
 Lai, Whalen (1982). Sinitic speculations on buddha-nature: The Nirvaana school (420-589), Philosophy East and West 32:2, p. 135-149
 Yamamoto, Kosho (tr.), Page, Tony (ed), (1999–2000). The Mahayana Mahaparinirvana Sutra  in 12 volumes. London: Nirvana Publications.

Mahayana
Heresy in Buddhism